The National Association of Australian University Colleges Inc (NAAUC) is the peak representative body for students living on Australian tertiary campuses. As a non-profit association, NAAUC aims to coordinate communication between a network of residences on a national scale, foster goodwill amongst association members, and liaise with college heads and administration in order to provide the best possible advice and referral to Australian colleges, residential halls of residences and student villages.

History
NAAUC was founded during a small gathering of College Club Presidents and Senior Students at an Intercollegiate Conference held in Canberra in 1967. The goal was to provide a forum for tertiary leaders living on campus, and the cause didn't stop there.

Aims
The aims of the Association were established in 1968:

To co-ordinate, on a national scale, a network of communications between members of the Association
To implement a system of liaison with heads of college in order to further the interests of member colleges and halls
To foster goodwill and understanding between members of the Association
To promote the efficient administration of college, hall and residential associations throughout the country
To provide colleges with information regarding pertinent issues
To develop and enable professionalism within college student bodies
To lead the development of colleges

The Executive
An executive of nine members are chosen by member residences each year to co-ordinate the activities and provide direction to the association for the following year.

The positions are President, Vice-President, Treasurer, Secretary, Creative Director, Marketing Director, Conference Directors (2) and Immediate Past Executive. A team of State Representatives also supports the Executive Committee.

The Current (2022) Executive is:

 President: Jack Agnew (Lincoln College, Adelaide) 
 Vice-President: Jordan Knight  (Emmanuel College, University of Queensland)
 Secretary: Evelyn Unwin Tew (Christ College, University of Tasmania)
 Treasurer: Samantha Cavaliere (Grace College, University of Queensland)
 Creative Director: Madison Johnston (Jane Franklin Hall, University of Tasmania) 
 Marketing Director: Lauren Thompson (Queens College, University of Melbourne)
Conference Director: Katherine Plume (St John's College, University of Queensland)
Conference Director: Tayla Farlie (St Mark's College, Adelaide)

Annual Conference
The association holds an annual conference for its members and involves a program of various activities all with relevance to on-campus residential living.  At each year's Conference, several colleges present bids in competition to host the conference in their city the following year.  Two conference directors from the host city are appointed and are responsible for the planning and running of the program under the supervision of the executive.  The program typically includes;

Workshops
Conflict Resolution
Event Planning and Liquor Licensing
Budgeting and Finance
Public speaking
Media and Publications
Sustainability
Crisis Management

Role Development Seminars
The NAAUC Conference has a vast alumnus of veteran college leaders to encourage
and aid future leaders. The Role Development Seminars are a key tool in passing
information to prospective office seekers and in sharing lessons learned - the hard way
- from other colleges. These sessions outline what prospective student leaders should do in preparation
for appointment, what sort of commitment various positions involve and issues they should
consider upon successful appointment. Seminars are presented in the areas of student club President and Vice-President, Secretary, Treasurer, Social Officer and Residential Advisor.

Community service
One of the more recent additions to the conference program has been a community service outing.  These outings have included day-long trips to areas outside host cities to survey and work on damaged land and vegetation. In 2005 the conference delegation planted more than 2000 tube stock native plants at a 93-hectare site in the Galada Tamboore Reserve in outer Melbourne.

Parliamentary Debating
The model debate gives delegates the opportunity to match
their wits in an educational and slightly comical look at
contentious college issues. Always one of the highlights of the
week, the conference parliamentary debate is usually held at the host city's Parliament
House.

Social Events
A full social program is the tradition of the annual conference.  From our staple events such as Merch-Swap, Charity Auction and Wine & Cheese night, to new and innovative events including NAAUChella, NAAUCing Dead, Barn Dance and Welcome to Country, NAAUC introduces new event ideas to colleges that focuses on inclusiveness and engagement. Night outings to renowned landmarks and activities unique to the host city are also popular, and in the past have included trips to the Fremantle Prison, AFL games at the Melbourne Cricket Ground as well as others.  In-house functions and a black-tie ball held at the end of the conference week are a highlight for many.

State associations

South Australia
The South Australian Association of University College Clubs (SAAUCC) is an association of the five undergraduate residential colleges located in Adelaide, South Australia. The college clubs involved are Aquinas College, Flinders University Hall, Lincoln College, St. Ann's College and St. Mark's College. Its primary function is to organise and stage sporting contests between the five colleges, especially for the Douglas Irving Cup, as well as inter-college social events. It is also responsible for intercollege-relations and discipline.

The independent Lutheran Seminary is not currently a member of SAAUCC.

The representative body for SAAUCC is the SAAUCC committee. Each individual college committee's President and two Sports Secretaries are automatically elected to the SAAUCC committee. In addition, each college may elect a further member from their community (not necessarily from their College Club Committee).

Past Conferences

2019 - International House, The University of Melbourne
2018 - Cromwell College, University of Queensland (Brisbane). 
2017 - Mannix College, Monash University (Melbourne)
2016 - Dunmore Lang College and Robert Menzies College Macquarie University (Sydney)
2015 - King's College and St John's College University of Queensland (Brisbane)
2014 - Ormond, Queens and St Hilda's College, The University of Melbourne (Melbourne)
2013 - The Women's College and St Leo's College University of Queensland (Brisbane)
2012 - Dunmore Lang College Macquarie University (Sydney)
2011 - Colleges of the University of Melbourne (Melbourne)
2010 - Colleges of the University of Queensland (Brisbane)
2009 - St Andrews's College, University of Sydney (Sydney)
2008 - Trinity College, the University of Western Australia (Perth)
2007 - Mannix College, Monash University (Melbourne)
2006 - King's College & Emmanuel College, The University of Queensland (Brisbane)
2005 - Ormond College & Queen's College, The University of Melbourne (Melbourne)
2004 - Trinity, the University of Western Australia (Perth)
2003 - Mannix College, Monash University (Melbourne)
2002 - John XXIII College & Burgmann College, Australian National University (Canberra)
2001 – Ormond, Queens and St Hilda's College, The University of Melbourne (Melbourne)
2000 – St Columba and St Thomas More College, University of Western Australia (Perth)
1999 – Deakin University Residences, Deakin University (Geelong)
1998 - Gatton College, University of Queensland (Gatton)
1997 - Kensington College, University of New South Wales (Sydney)
1996 - The Terraces, La Trobe University (Bendigo)
1995 - Christ College, University of Tasmania (Hobart)
1994 - Earle Page College, University of New England (Armidale)
1993 - Currie Hall, University of Western Australia (Perth)
1992 - Queen's College, The University of Melbourne (Melbourne)
1991 - Emmanuel College, University of Queensland (Brisbane)
1990 - Jane Franklin Hall, University of Tasmania (Hobart)
1989 - St. Mark's College, James Cook University (Townsville)
1988 - St. Mark's College, University of Adelaide (Adelaide)
1987 - St. John's College, University of Sydney (Sydney)
1986 - The Women's College, University of Sydney (Sydney)
1985 - St. Columba College, University of Western Australia (Perth)
1984 - International House, The University of Melbourne (Melbourne)

COVID-19
During the COVID-19 crisis, the NAAUC team has strived to provide resources and support for communities that have taken heavy hits to their social and financial activities. In April 2020, the organisation published a handbook to assist student leaders in the continuation of community activities whilst under government restrictions and physical distancing measures.

External links
NAAUC website

Educational organisations based in Australia
Groups of students' unions
Australia
Student politics in Australia
Students' unions in Australia